Bahattin Ekinci Sports Hall is a multi-purpose indoor sport venue located in Tekkeköy district of Samsun Province, northern Turkey. It was named in honor of a local politician and the chairman of the local football club in Tekkeköy, who died in 2011.

The venue is situated on the Samsun-Ordu Highway  in  Tekkeköy. It hosts basketball, volleyball, and karate competitions mostly for schools. Some group matches of the Turkish Women's Regional Volleyball League are played also in the sports hall.

International events hosted
The venue will host basketball events of the 2017 Summer Deaflympics along with Yaşar Doğu Sport Hall located in the same city.

References

Sports venues in Samsun
Indoor arenas in Turkey
Basketball venues in Turkey
Volleyball venues in Turkey
Tekkeköy